Pethia is a genus of small freshwater fish in the family Cyprinidae native to South Asia, East Asia (only Pethia stoliczkana recorded) and Mainland Southeast Asia. Some species are commonly seen in the aquarium trade. The name Pethia is derived from the Sinhalese "pethia", a generic word used to describe any of several small species of cyprinid fishes. Most members of this genus were included in Puntius, until it was revised in 2012.

Species
There are currently 39 recognized species in this genus:
 Pethia atra (Linthoingambi & Vishwanath, 2007)
 Pethia aurea Knight, 2013
 Pethia bandula (Kottelat & Pethiyagoda, 1991) (Bandula barb)
 Pethia canius (F. Hamilton, 1822)
 Pethia conchonius (F. Hamilton, 1822) (Rosy barb)
 Pethia cumingii (Günther, 1868) (Cuming's barb)
 Pethia didi (S. O. Kullander & F. Fang, 2005)
 Pethia erythromycter (S. O. Kullander, 2008)
 Pethia expletiforis Mayanglambam & Vishwanath, 2013
 Pethia gelius (F. Hamilton, 1822) (Golden barb)
 Pethia guganio (F. Hamilton, 1822) (Glass barb)
 Pethia khugae (Linthoingambi & Vishwanath, 2007)
 Pethia longicauda U. Katwate, Paingankar, Raghavan & Dahanukar, 2014
 Pethia lutea U. Katwate, C. Katwate, Raghavan, Paingankar & Dahanukar, 2014 (Citron barb)
 Pethia macrogramma (S. O. Kullander, 2008)
 Pethia manipurensis (Menon, Rema Devi & Vishwanath, 2000)
 Pethia meingangbii (Arunkumar & Tombi Singh, 2003)
 Pethia melanomaculata (Deraniyagala, 1956)
Pethia muvattupuzhaensis (Jameela Beevi & Ramachandran, 2005)
 Pethia nankyweensis (S. O. Kullander, 2008)
 Pethia narayani (Hora, 1937) (Narayan barb)
 Pethia nigripinna (Knight, Rema Devi, T. J. Indra & Arunachalam, 2012)
 Pethia nigrofasciata (Günther, 1868) (Black-ruby barb)
 Pethia ornatus (Vishwanath & Laisram, 2004)
 Pethia padamya (S. O. Kullander & Britz, 2008) (Odessa barb)
 Pethia phutunio (F. Hamilton, 1822) (Spotted-sail barb)
 Pethia poiensis Shangningam & Waikhom, 2018
 Pethia pookodensis (Mercy & Eapen, 2007)
 Pethia punctata (F. Day, 1865)
 Pethia reval (Meegaskumbura, N. K. A. Silva, Maduwage & Pethiyagoda, 2008)
 Pethia rutila Lalramliana, Knight & Laltlanhlua, 2014
 Pethia sanjaymoluri U. Katwate, Jadhav, Kumkar, Raghavan & Dahanukar, 2016 (Sanjay's black-tip pethia)
 Pethia setnai (Chhapgar & S. R. Sane, 1992)
 Pethia shalynius (G. M. Yazdani & S. K. Talukdar, 1975) (Shalyni barb)
 Pethia sharmai (Menon & Rema Devi, 1993)
 Pethia stoliczkana (F. Day, 1871) 
 Pethia striata Atkore, Knight, Rema Devi & Krishnaswamy, 2015 (Kudremukh barb)
 Pethia thelys (S. O. Kullander, 2008)
 Pethia tiantian (S. O. Kullander & F. Fang, 2005)
 Pethia ticto (F. Hamilton, 1822) (Hamilton's ticto barb)
 Pethia yuensis (Arunkumar & Tombi Singh, 2003)

References

 
Barbs (fish)
Taxa named by Rohan Pethiyagoda
Taxa named by Madhava Meegaskumbura
Taxa named by Kalana Maduwage